Suiping County is a county in the south of Henan province, China. It is under the administration of Zhumadian City.

Administrative divisions
As 2021, this county is divided to 5 subdistricts, 8 towns, 2 townships and 3 others.
Subdistricts

Towns

Townships

Others
 Industrial Park
 Chaku Mountain Scenic Area
 Fengming Valley Scenic Area

Climate

References

County-level divisions of Henan
Zhumadian